Thomas MacNevin (1814 – 8 February 1848) was an influential Irish writer and journalist, who died under "peculiarly sad circumstances" in a Bristol asylum. According to T. F. O'Sullivan, he was one of the most "brilliant intellects" to be associated with The Nation newspaper and with the Young Ireland movement.

Background

According to the official records of Trinity College, Dublin, which he entered at the age of 17, Thomas MacNevin was born in Dublin, the son of Daniel MacNevin, although it has also been suggested that he was born in Galway. Charles Gavan Duffy in his Young Ireland: a Fragment of Irish History, 1840–45 described MacNevin as being "below the middle size but well made, well poised, and agile" with auburn hair and clear blue eyes, "which he believed he inherited from Danish ancestors." His face was "mobile, and possessed the power not given to one man in ten thousand, of expressing a wide range of feeling without exaggeration or grimace."

Education
During his time at Trinity College, MacNevin became treasurer of the College Historical Society between 1834–35, and auditor in 1837–38. The society had been founded by Edmund Burke nearly a century before, and had trained three generations of Irish orators and statesmen.  However, in 1838 the society was exiled from the college that gave it a name. It was during this period that MacNevin became its President.

The meetings were held in Radley's Hotel, and attracted audiences with their vehement and flamboyant eloquence. Isaac Butt, Joseph Lefanu, Torrens M'Cullagh, Thomas Wallis, James O'Hea, William Keogh, and Joseph Pollock all debated in a style reminiscent of that of the old Irish Parliament. At Trinity College, MacNevin studied elocution under John Vandenhoff and Sheridan Knowles. He completed his degree in 1838, and was called to the Bar the following year.

Career
In 1844, MacNevin edited the State Trials, and later he wrote two volumes for the Young Ireland "Library of Ireland". The first, a History of the Irish Volunteers of 1782, was published in 1845, followed by The Confiscation of Ulster in 1846. In 1845, he published Gerald, a three-act play on the invasion of Ireland by Henry II in 1171. Also in this year he edited and published The speeches of the Right Honourable Richard Lalor Sheil. MacNevin contributed to the Northern Catholic newspaper The Vindicator.

MacNevin worked on The Nation newspaper of the Young Ireland group for two years. He felt the death of Davis in 1845 keenly, and in the last remaining years of his life was mentally affected.

Death
MacNevin died on 8 February 1848 in an asylum in Bristol. On 19 February, The Nation paid a tribute to their former colleague and friend.

Works

References

Further reading

 

 
 

 About in Ireland, James Connolly, Fleet Street 1910
 The Re-Conquest of Ireland, James Connolly, Fleet Street 1915
 John Mitchel Noted Irish Lives, Louis J. Walsh, The Talbot Press Ltd 1934
 Thomas Davis: Essays and Poems, Centenary Memoir, M. H Gill, M.H. Gill & Son, Ltd MCMXLV.
 Life of John Martin, P. A. Sillard, James Duffy & Co., Ltd 1901
 Life of John Mitchel, P. A. Sillard, James Duffy and Co., Ltd 1908
 John Mitchel, P. S. O'Hegarty, Maunsel & Company, Ltd 1917
 The Fenians in Context: Irish Politics & Society 1848–82, R. V. Comerford, Wolfhound Press 1998
 William Smith O'Brien and the Young Ireland Rebellion of 1848, Robert Sloan, Four Courts Press 2000
 Irish Mitchel, Seamus MacCall, Thomas Nelson and Sons Ltd 1938
 Ireland Her Own, T. A. Jackson, Lawrence & Wishart Ltd 1976
 Life and Times of Daniel O'Connell, T. C. Luby, Cameron & Ferguson
 Young Ireland, T. F. O'Sullivan, The Kerryman Ltd. 1945
 Irish Rebel John Devoy and America's Fight for Irish Freedom, Terry Golway, St. Martin's Griffin 1998
 Paddy's Lament: Ireland 1846–1847, Prelude to Hatred, Thomas Gallagher, Poolbeg 1994.
 The Great Shame, Thomas Keneally, Anchor Books 1999.
 James Fintan Lalor, Thomas, P. O'Neill, Golden Publications 2003.
 Charles Gavan Duffy: Conversations With Carlyle (1892), with Introduction, Stray Thoughts On Young Ireland, by Brendan Clifford, Athol Books, Belfast,. (Pg. 32 Titled, Foster’s account Of Young Ireland.)
 Envoi, Taking Leave Of Roy Foster, by Brendan Clifford and Julianne Herlihy, Aubane Historical Society, Cork.
 The Falcon Family, or, Young Ireland, by M. W. Savage, London, 1845. (An Gorta Mor)Quinnipiac University

People from County Galway
People from County Dublin
Irish journalists
Irish writers
Alumni of Trinity College Dublin
19th-century Irish people
1848 deaths
1814 births
19th-century journalists
Male journalists
19th-century male writers